A referendum on lowering the voting age from 21 to 18 was held in Denmark on 24 June 1969. The proposed change was rejected by 78.6% of voters with a turnout of 63.6%. Two years later, the electoral age was instead lowered to 20 years, and finally, after a 1978 referendum, to 18 years.

Results

References

Referendums in Denmark
Danish electoral age referendum
Electoral age referendum
Suffrage referendums
Danish electoral age referendum
Electoral reform in Denmark
Danish electoral age referendum